The Georgefischeriales are an order of smut fungi in the class Exobasidiomycetes. The order consists of four families, the Eballistraceae, the Georgefischeriaceae, the Gjaerumiaceae, and the Tilletiariaceae.

References

Ustilaginomycotina
Fungal plant pathogens and diseases
Basidiomycota orders
Taxa described in 1997
Taxa named by Franz Oberwinkler